Esprit or L'Esprit may refer to:
 the French for Spirit; as a loanword:
 Enthusiasm, intense interest or motivation
 Morale, motivation and readiness
 Geist "mind/spirit; intellect"
 Esprit (name), a given name and surname
 Esprit (magazine), a periodical

 L'esprit (In the Nursery album)

 Lotus Esprit, a car
 Esprit Holdings, a clothing manufacturer
 Esprit D'Air, a Japanese metal band
 European Strategic Program on Research in Information Technology, a cooperative government program
 Estimation of signal parameters via rotational invariance techniques, a signal processing method
 European System Providing Refueling, Infrastructure and Telecommunications, a planned module of the Lunar Gateway

See also